The Washington State Department of Corrections (WADOC) is a department of the government of the state of Washington. WADOC is responsible for administering adult corrections programs operated by the State of Washington. This includes state correctional institutions and programs for people supervised in the community. Its headquarters are in Tumwater, Washington.

History
The modern Washington Department of Corrections is a relatively young state agency. Agency oversight of correctional institutions in Washington State went through several transitions during the 20th century before the WADOC's creation in 1981.

Prior to the 1970s, state correctional facilities were managed by the Washington Department of Institutions. governor Daniel J. Evans consolidated the Department of Institutions, Department of Public Assistance & Vocational Rehabilitation, and other related departments into the Washington State Department of Social and Health Services (DSHS) in the 1970s.

On July 1, 1981, the Washington State Legislature transferred the administration of adult correctional institutions from the Washington State Department of Social and Health Services, Division of Adult Corrections (DSHS) to the newly created Washington State Department of Corrections as part of the 1981 Corrections Reform Act.

Organizational structure
The Washington Department of Corrections organizational structure includes six major divisions:
Women’s Prisons
Men’s Prisons
Community Corrections
Administrative Operations
Health Services
Reentry

Each division has an assistant secretary who oversees the division's operations.

The secretary of corrections is the executive head of the department. The secretary is appointed by the governor with the consent of the state Senate.

Department facilities

Prisons

The department currently operates 12 adult prisons, of which 10 are male institutions and two are female institutions. The department confines over 12,000 people in these facilities, with each varying in size and mission across the state.

Work releases

The department currently has 12 work release facilities. All but two of these facilities are operated by contractors, who manage the daily safety and security and have oversight of the facilities full-time (24 hours a day, 7 days per week). Department staff are located on site to assist in supervision, monitoring, and case management of those under supervision, as well as monitoring of the contracts.

Formerly incarcerated people housed in work release facilities have progressed from full confinement to partial confinement, and are required to seek, secure, and maintain employment in the community, as well as pay for their room and board. This model is designed to provide some foundation for employment and housing when the formerly incarcerated are released to communities. However, a 2015 Washington Supreme Court Minority and Justice Commission symposium revealed that reentry resources for formerly incarcerated people in Washington State are still severely underfunded and disconnected.

Field offices
Community Supervision occurs at 86 varied locations in the community to include: field offices, community justice centers, Community Oriented Policing (COP) Shops and outstations. Activities of supervised people in the community are monitored, which includes home visits, by a Community Corrections Officer to ensure compliance with court, or known as the Indeterminate Sentence Review Board, which was the Washington State Board of Prison Terms and Paroles (ISRB), only those individuals who have been deemed rehabilitated by the ISRB are placed on Parole and department conditions of supervision, such as Community Supervision and/or Community Custody.

Death row

In 2014, Governor Jay Inslee announced a moratorium on carrying out the death penalty in Washington State. According to Inslee, "Equal justice under the law is the state's primary responsibility. And in death penalty cases, I'm not convinced equal justice is being served. The use of the death penalty in this state is unequally applied, sometimes dependent on the budget of the county where the crime occurred." The moratorium means that if a death penalty case comes to the governor's desk for action, he will issue a reprieve. However, this action does not commute the sentences of those on death row or issue any pardons. The majority of Washington's death penalty sentences are overturned and those convicted of capital offenses are rarely executed, indicating questionable sentencing in many cases. Since 1981, the year Washington State's current capital laws were put in place, 32 defendants have been sentenced to die. Of those, 18 have had their sentences converted to life in prison and one was set free.

Prior to Inslee's moratorium, Washington's capital punishment law required that capital punishment imposed by the state's courts be carried out at the Washington State Penitentiary in Walla Walla. Procedures for conducting executions are supervised by the Penitentiary Superintendent. Washington utilizes two methods of execution: lethal injection and hanging. Lethal injection is used unless the inmate under sentence of death chooses hanging as the preferred execution method.

Within 10 days of a trial court entering a judgment and sentence imposing the death penalty, male defendants under sentence of death are transferred to the Penitentiary, where they remain in a segregation unit [Intensive Management Unit North (IMU-N) at the prison] pending appeals and until a death warrant is issued setting the date for the execution. Female defendants under sentence of death are housed at the Washington Corrections Center for Women in Gig Harbor before being transferred to the Penitentiary no later than 72 hours prior to a scheduled execution, also housed in IMU North, although the execution chamber is located in Unit 6.

78 persons have been executed in Washington since 1904, the most recent being Cal Coburn Brown, in 2010.

Correctional Industries
The Washington Department of Corrections revenue-generating, industry job training, and factory food production branch is Washington State Correctional Industries. It is a member of the National Correctional Industries Association.

Correctional Industries began centralizing food production at the Airway Heights Correctional Center in 1995. In the years since, freshly cooked food for incarcerated people in Washington prisons has gradually and in large part been replaced by factory processed, prepackaged food.

Private contracts

Private prisons
On May 21, 2015, The GEO Group announced the signing of a contract with the Washington Department of Corrections for the out-of-state housing of up to 1,000 prisoners at the company-owned North Lake Correctional Facility in Baldwin, Michigan, with a contract term of five years inclusive of renewal option periods.

Food vendors
Under the Washington state Food Umbrella Contract, WA DOC's Correctional Industries procures products from Food Services of America, Liberty Distributing, Medosweet Farms, Spokane Produce, Terry Dairy's, Triple "B" Corporations, and Unisource. WA DOC also contracts with Evergreen Vending, Coca-Cola, and other private food vendors for its facility vending machines.

Communications
WA DOC contracts with JPay, a private company that charges the incarcerated and their families for electronic mail, photo-sharing, money transfer, and video visiting services. Phone services for the incarcerated and their families are through WA DOC's contract with Global Tel Link.

Secretary of Corrections

The secretary of corrections in Washington State is a cabinet level position appointed by the state governor. This position differs from the historical director of the Washington Department of Institutions in its educational requirements. In the 1950s and 1960s, Washington law mandated that directors of the Department of Institutions were required to hold graduate degrees. The modern Washington Department of Corrections has no such requirements for its secretary of corrections.

Amos Reed
Amos Reed, appointed by Governor John Spellman, served as the first Washington state secretary of corrections from 1981 to 1986.

Prior to his position as secretary, Reed served as an administrator in the Oregon Department of Corrections from 1969 to 1975.

Chase Riveland
Chase Riveland was appointed Secretary of Corrections by Governor Booth Gardner in 1986.  He retired in 1997.  Riveland drew criticism from Republican lawmakers who felt he was not harsh enough on incarcerated people.  However, his cautions against politically-driven policies have proven prescient in the mass incarceration decades that followed his time as secretary.  By 2008, the number of people incarcerated in Washington had more than tripled since the time Riveland first came to WADOC.

Joseph D. Lehman
Joe Lehman was a graduate of St. Martin's College and Pacific Lutheran University.  He spent 21 years as a probation and parole officer and deputy secretary in Washington's prison system.  Lehman was appointed secretary of Corrections by Governor Gary Locke in 1997, and served until 2005.  Prior to serving as WADOC secretary, Lehman oversaw Pennsylvania's largest prison expansion in state history and then worked for the Maine correctional system.  In 1994, Lehman won the Association of State Correctional Administrators Francke Award. Lehman's starting salary as WADOC secretary was $93,659  He oversaw WADOC at a time when the department had a budget of $765 million, with 12,825 incarcerated people and 6,300 employees]

Harold Clarke
Harold Clarke, appointed by Governor Christine Gregoire, served as Secretary of Corrections from 2005 until his resignation in late 2007.   Prior to his appointment, he directed the Nebraska Department of Corrections, where he had climbed through the ranks for over twenty years.  He resigned as WADOC secretary amid controversy over probation supervision to take a position as commissioner of the Massachusetts Department of Corrections.

Eldon Vail
Eldon Vail returned from retirement after 31 years with WADOC to serve as Acting Secretary of Corrections until his formal appointment as Secretary by Governor Christine Gregoire in 2008.  Vail resigned amid controversy over an affair with a subordinate in 2011.

Bernard Warner
Bernard Warner was appointed by Governor Christine Gregoire as Secretary of Corrections in 2011.  Warner resigned in 2015 to take a position at a private Salt Lake City corrections industry.

Dan Pacholke
Governor Jay Inslee appointed Dan Pacholke Secretary of Corrections in 2015.  Pacholke began his career in WADOC in 1982 as a correctional officer at McNeil Island Corrections Center.  He worked his way through the ranks until he was appointed secretary.  Pacholke resigned after a short tenure amid controversy over a WADOC computer glitch that caused the somewhat early release of approximately 3,000 incarcerated people over more than a decade.  Some formerly incarcerated people who had established new lives upon early release were reincarcerated in response to public and political outcry over the early releases.  The early release scandal became an expression of more complex political relationships in anticipation of the 2016 Washington State election season.  In a resignation email to Senator Mike Padden—one of the most conservative members of the Washington State Senate's Law and Justice Committee—Pacholke wrote, "I notify you now of my resignation.  I hope it helps meet your need for blood.  I hope it gives you fodder for the press and fulfills your political needs so you can let this agency, our agency, heal."  Former secretary of corrections Bernie Warner told the media he did not know about the computer glitch until notified by Governor Jay Inslee's general counsel.  However, Pacholke told the media that Warner's assistant secretary knew of the mistaken early release of prisoners as early as 2012. At least two people were killed in homicides linked to prisoners who had mistakenly been released early, and families of the deceased in each of those cases went on to file wrongful death lawsuits against the agency. One of those lawsuits resulted in a $3.25 million settlement paid out by the DOC.

Since leaving WADOC, Pacholke has become the co-director at Segregation Solutions. He co-authored a report with Sandy Felkey Mullins on segregation practices for the U.S. Department of Justice Bureau of Justice Assistance titled "More Than Emptying Beds: A Systems Approach to Segregation Reform".

Richard Morgan
Richard "Dick"  Morgan returned from retirement after more than three decades of employment with WA DOC to be appointed by Governor Jay Inslee as acting secretary, effective March 14, 2016.  He served in the role of secretary until January 12, 2017.  Morgan had previously served as a member of the Indeterminate Sentence Review Board and of the Washington Coalition to Abolish the Death Penalty.

Jody Becker-Green
Former Washington State Department of Social and Health Services employee Jody Becker-Green was appointed by Governor Jay Inslee as acting secretary from January 10, 2017 to April 25, 2017, becoming the first woman to serve in this role.

Stephen Sinclair
Stephen Sinclair was appointed WA DOC secretary by Governor Jay Inslee on April 25, 2017. He began his career at the agency as a correctional officer and gained progressively greater responsibilities as investigator, sergeant, associate superintendent, superintendent and assistant secretary.

As superintendent of the Washington State Penitentiary, Sinclair created the Sustainable Practices Lab. In addition to his role as secretary, he was the DOC co-director of the Sustainability in Prisons Project at The Evergreen State College.

Cheryl Strange

On April 29, 2021, Washington State Governor Jay Inslee appointed Cheryl Strange as the Washington DOC's first permanent female secretary. Prior to her appointment, Strange was Secretary of the Washington State Department of Social and Health Services. She had previously served as the CEO of Western State Hospital.

Staff

Paramilitary culture
WADOC is a paramilitary organization and values respect for chain of command and seniority. The department recruits much of its correctional staff from Joint Base Lewis–McChord career fairs.

Labor union
Non-management positions in the Washington Department of Corrections are negotiated by the Teamsters Local 117 labor union.

Honor guard
WADOC Honor Guard protocols are governed by WADOC Policy 870.440. Individual WADOC correctional facilities are not required to maintain an Honor Guard. As of 2013, only five of WADOC's 12 facilities maintained an active Honor Guard. Facility superintendents and Chiefs of Emergency Operation are responsible for selecting Honor Guard members and approving Honor Guard participation in local events.

Line of duty deaths
The most well-known line of duty death in recent WADOC history was that of Jayme Biendl in 2011. This incident has been called "the Washington Department of Corrections 9/11", as it resulted in dramatic changes to WADOC security protocols and programs for incarcerated people. An annual Behind the Badge memorial run is held in honor of Biendl's service.

Key issues
In 2012, WADOC correctional officers advocated for improved uniforms in keeping with the standards of uniforms of other Washington law enforcement agencies. Prior to 2012, correctional officer uniforms were made by incarcerated people in industry job positions. This provided 100 jobs for incarcerated people, as well as eight supervisory correctional officer positions. Officer Carl Beatty was a public spokesman for a shift to professional uniforms made by outside manufacturers with significant savings to the State of Washington in cost, with the result that House Bill 2346 passed during the 2012 Washington State Regular Legislative Session. This bill removed the requirement that correctional officer uniforms come from Correctional Industries. WA DOC Policy 870.400 lists detailed requirements for staff uniforms.

Ombudsman
In 2007, the Washington Religious Society of Friends (Quakers) spearheaded legislative efforts to create an independent ombudsman position that would provide an alternative avenue of mediation between WADOC, WADOC staff, incarcerated people, and family members of the incarcerated. The resulting bill, SB 5295—sponsored by state Senators Jim Kastama, Dan Swecker, Karen Fraser, Jeanne Kohl-Welles, Chris Marr, Debbie Regala, Marilyn Rasmussen, and Rosemary McAuliffe—was not successful. In the years since, many other community groups have added their support for these legislative efforts. Annual attempts to pass an independent ombudsman bill began in 2013 with SB 5177, sponsored by Senators Mike Carrell and Steve Conway. In 2014, Senators Conway, Jeannie Darneille, Steve O'Ban, Jeanne Kohl-Welles, and Annette Cleveland sponsored SB 6399. In 2015, Senators Jeannie Darneille, Rosemary McAuliffe, Jeanne Kohl-Welles, Steve O'Ban, Maralyn Chase, Bob Hasegawa, Karen Keiser, Kirk Pearson, Steve Conway, and David Frockt sponsored SB 5505, with Representatives Luis Moscoso, Roger Goodman, Eric Pettigrew, Sherry Appleton, Tina Orwall, Timm Ormsby, and Laurie Jinkins sponsoring companion bill HB 2005.

In the 2016 legislative session, Senators Mark Miloscia, Christine Rolfes, Kirk Pearson, Steve O'Ban, Steve Conway, and Rosemary McAuliffe sponsored unsuccessful SB 6154, with Representatives Luis Moscoso, Eric Pettigrew, Sherry Appleton, Tina Orwall, David Sawyer, Cindy Ryu, Derek Stanford, Gerry Pollet, Teri Hickel, Steve Bergquist, and Sharon Tomiko Santos sponsoring companion HB 2817.

In the 2017-2018 legislative session an ombudsman bill, HB 1889, passed both chambers of the legislature.

WADOC opposed these legislative efforts. In 2016, WADOC created its own internal ombudsman position. Carlos Lugo, who had previously worked on a special WADOC project concerning visitation access for Latino incarcerated people, was hired as the first WADOC ombudsman.

Contraband
The WADOC Intelligence and Investigations Unit asked the FBI to become involved in the investigation of employee contraband smuggling at WADOC's Monroe Correctional Complex smuggling in December 2015. A correctional officer was arrested on September 29, 2016. FBI agents determined the officer was accepting bribes of up to $1,000 to smuggle contraband into the prison.

In August 2016 a 23-year-old incarcerated man at Monroe Correctional Complex died from a drug overdose, causing renewed concerns statewide about contraband entering WADOC prisons.

Sustainability in Prisons Project
At Cedar Creek Corrections Center in 2003, the Washington State Department of Corrections and The Evergreen State College founded the Sustainability in Prisons Project (SPP). Dan Pacholke was Cedar Creek Correctional Center's superintendent at the time, and started composting and water catchment programs to save money and create meaningful work for the men incarcerated at the minimum security facility. Dr. Nalini Nadkarni, a member of the faculty at Evergreen, asked for incarcerated people to join her in a study to grow native mosses, and Cedar Creek welcomed her proposal. From here, the partnership between Evergreen and WADOC strengthened and expanded. In the decade plus since, SPP has expanded to several other WADOC prisons. Incarcerated people raise endangered species and carry out impressive composting operations using recycled construction materials.

Timeline of key events
1981 - New Department of Corrections is created to oversee correctional institutions previously overseen by Department of Social and Health Services.
1984 - Sentencing Review Act (SRA) overhauls state's criminal code.
1995 - Correctional Industries centralized factory food production begins at Airway Heights Correctional Center.
2000s - Incarcerated people are required to order food packages from a few select contract vendors instead of local grocery stores.
2003 - DOC and Evergreen State College collaborate to found the Sustainability in Prisons Project
2009 - Incarcerated people are required to wear uniforms instead of personal clothing.
2011 - Line of duty death of Officer Jayme Biendl brings increased attention to security.
2015 - State Senate passes SB 5650, establishing a medical subaccount exempt from WADOC deductions to incarcerated people's personal accounts.
2016 - WADOC hires an internal ombudsman. Secretary Dick Morgan publicly states that the WADOC will phase out the use of the word "offender".

See also

 List of law enforcement agencies in Washington (state)
 List of U.S. state prisons
 List of United States state correction agencies

References

External links
 
 Washington State Correctional Industries
 doc.wa.gov

State law enforcement agencies of Washington (state)

Corrections
Lists of United States state prisons
 
State corrections departments of the United States
1981 establishments in Washington (state)
Government agencies established in 1981